Doniophyton is a genus of South American flowering plants in the daisy family.

 Species
 Doniophyton anomalum (D.Don) Kurtz - Chile, Argentina
 Doniophyton weddellii Katinas & Stuessy - Chile, Argentina

References

Barnadesioideae
Asteraceae genera
Flora of South America